The 1999 WPSL Senior Draft was the third annual collegiate draft for the WPSL/WPF's 1999 season, and was held on Saturday, December 5, in St. Petersburg Beach, Fla, at the Tradewinds Resort in conjunction with the 1998 NFCA National Convention.

Draft Selections 

Following are the 60 selections from the 1999 WPSL draft:

Position key: 
C = Catcher; UT = Utility infielder; INF = Infielder; 1B = First base; 2B =Second base SS = Shortstop; 3B = Third base; OF = Outfielder; RF = Right field; CF = Center field; LF = Left field;  P = Pitcher; RHP = right-handed Pitcher; LHP = left-handed Pitcher; DP =Designated player
Positions are listed as combined for those who can play multiple positions.

Round 1

Round 2

Round 3

Round 4

Round 5

Round 6

Round 7

Round 8

Round 9

Round 10

Draft notes

References

External links

See also

 List of professional sports leagues
 List of professional sports teams in the United States and Canada

Softball in the United States
Softball teams
WPSL